Tremont station may refer to:

Tremont station (Charlotte), a former Charlotte Trolley station in Charlotte, North Carolina
Tremont station (Indiana), a former station on the South Shore Line in Indiana
Tremont Railroad Station (Massachusetts), a former train station in Tremont, Massachusetts
Tremont (Metro-North station), a Metro-North Railroad station in the New York City borough of the Bronx